The Court of Missing Heirs is an American old-time radio human interest drama. It was broadcast on CBS October 11, 1937 - September 29, 1942 and on ABC March 31, 1946 - April 6, 1947. It also went by the titles The Board of Missing Heirs and Are You a Missing Heir?

Format
Each episode of The Court of Missing Heirs featured two dramatizations of real-life situations involving people who died leaving estates that had been unclaimed.

After having handled probate cases that involved unclaimed estates, attorney James Waters originally planned to use the concept of finding missing heirs in a book. When publishing companies rejected his manuscript, he adapted the idea to radio. Waters and Alfred Shebel used actual court records to conduct the research for each episode. In 1942, the program reached the $1 million mark in helping people collect legacies that had been unclaimed.

The program originated at WBBM in Chicago, Illinois, and was sponsored by Sterling Products.

Personnel
The program had no continuing characters. Actors frequently heard on it included Walter Kinsella, Kenny Delmar, Jeanette Nolan, Everett Sloane, and Carl Frank. The narrator was James Marshall.

Everard Wilson Meade and Alfred Shebel were producers. Directors were John Loveton, Charles Harrell, and Rodney Erickson. Ira Marion was the writer, and Rosa Rio provided the music.

Selected cases resolved by the program
1936 - A nephew of Michael Cusack, who died in Chicago, was located in regard to an approximately $6,000 estate.
1940 - Mrs. Myrtle Garvey Juranics received $4,000 from the unclaimed estate of her husband.
1941 - The son and daughter of Joseph J. Hoagland received approximately $4,500 after his death.

References in popular culture
Producer and director Tim Whelan based the RKO film Seven Days' Leave (1942) on an episode of The Court of Missing Heirs that he heard. The film included scenes of a broadcast of the program.

Joseph Spalding's 1942 play Spider Island features a character, Star Mayo, who learns from The Court of Missing Heirs program that she has inherited Spider Island and wants to claim her property.

Legal action
In 1943, producers Waters and Shebel sued Herbert and Dorothy Fields, writers of the play Something for the Boys, charging plagiarism. An article in the May 8, 1943, issue of Billboard reported that Walters and Shebel "allege that the idea of the show starring Ethel Merman was stolen from their program." 20th Century Fox, which produced a film version of the play and had "a financial interest in the show", was also a defendant.

References

External links

Article
 "I Got $4,000 Out of the Air" — From Radio and Television Mirror, a first-person account by the recipient of $4,000 from The Court of Missing Heirs

Script
 A transcription of the September 23, 1941, episode of Board of Missing Heirs from the University of Virginia Library

1937 radio programme debuts
1947 radio programme endings
ABC radio programs
CBS Radio programs
1930s American radio programs
1940s American radio programs